The tribe Indigofereae is a subdivision of the plant family Fabaceae. It is consistently recovered as a monophyletic clade in molecular phylogenies. The Indigofereae arose 30.0 ± 3.3 million years ago (in the Oligocene).

This tribe does not currently have a node-based, phylogenetic definition, but it can be distinguished by the following morphological synapomorphies: the presence of biramous hairs, keel spurs, short free staminal filaments, and short fruiting pedicels; and the loss of stipels and seed arils.

Genera
Indigofereae comprises the following genera:

 Cyamopsis DC.
 Indigastrum Jaub. & Spach
 Indigofera L.
 Microcharis Benth.

 Phylloxylon Baill.
 Rhynchotropis Harms.

Systematics
Modern molecular phylogenetics suggest the following relationships:

References

External links

 
Fabaceae tribes